Man's Myth is the fourth album by American hip-hop duo Twiztid. Released on June 28, 2005, it is the first half of the Man's Myth/Mutant double album, released one month before its companion album, Mutant. In his review of the album, Allmusic's David Jeffries wrote that "while the album doesn't have E-40 or Bushwick Bill guest shots like 2003's Green Book did, it reaches farther outside the suburban trash world of Psychopathic Records than anything the label has released previously. Twiztid keeps growing lyrically too and the album is edited tightly with little filler."

Track listing

Charts

References 
General

 

Specific

2005 albums
Twiztid albums
Albums produced by Esham
Psychopathic Records albums